

Presidents

List of presidents of the Canadian National Railway (CN) since 1919:

Presidents

See also
Canadian National Railway

References

Canadian National Railway
Canadian National Railway
Canadian National Railway
|-
|2022-Present
|Tracy Robinson
|
|}